Jean-Luc Ribar (25 February 1965 – 17 March 2022) was a French professional footballer who played as an attacking midfielder.

Career
Born in Roanne, Ribar played for Saint-Étienne B, Saint-Étienne, Lille, Quimper, and Rennes. After retiring in 1996, aged 30, he ran a number of cleaning companies near his hometown of Roanne.

References

1965 births
2022 deaths
French footballers
AS Saint-Étienne players
Lille OSC players
Quimper Kerfeunteun F.C. players
Stade Rennais F.C. players
Ligue 1 players
Ligue 2 players
Association football midfielders
Sportspeople from Roanne
Footballers from Auvergne-Rhône-Alpes